Wilhelm Konrad Hermann Müller (27 May 1812, Holzminden – 4 January 1890, Göttingen) was a philologist of Germanic studies.

From 1830 he studied philology and theology at the University of Göttingen as a student of Karl Otfried Müller. In 1841 he started work as a lecturer of German language and literature at Göttingen, becoming an associate professor in January 1845. From 1856 up until his death in 1890, he was a full professor of philology at Göttingen.

Works 
With Georg Schambach, he was co-author of a book on Lower Saxon legends and fairy tales, titled "Niedersächsische Sagen und Märchen" (1855). With Friedrich Karl Theodor Zarncke, he was an editor of a four-part Middle High German dictionary ("Mittelhochdeutsches Wörterbuch", 1854-1866) that was initiated by Georg Friedrich Benecke. Other noted works associated with Müller include:
 De Corcyræorum republica, 1835 – On the republic of the Corcyreans. [what is now modern-day Corfu ]
 Geschichte und System der altdeutschen Religion, Göttingen 1844 – History and system of the old German religion. 
 Mythologie der deutschen Heldensage, Heilbronn 1886 – Mythology of the German heroic saga.

References 

1812 births
1890 deaths
Academic staff of the University of Göttingen
University of Göttingen alumni
German philologists
People from Holzminden